Hocking Township is one of the thirteen townships of Fairfield County, Ohio, United States. As of the 2010 census the population was 4,672.

Geography
Located in the southern part of the county, it borders the following townships:
Greenfield Township - north
Pleasant Township - northeast corner
Berne Township - east
Madison Township - south
Clearcreek Township - southwest corner
Amanda Township - west
Bloom Township - northwest corner

Much of northeastern Hocking Township is occupied by the city of Lancaster, the county seat of Fairfield County.

Name and history
It is the only Hocking Township statewide.

Government
The township is governed by a three-member board of trustees, who are elected in November of odd-numbered years to a four-year term beginning on the following January 1. Two are elected in the year after the presidential election and one is elected in the year before it. There is also an elected township fiscal officer, who serves a four-year term beginning on April 1 of the year after the election, which is held in November of the year before the presidential election. Vacancies in the fiscal officership or on the board of trustees are filled by the remaining trustees.

References

External links
Hocking Township official website
County website

Townships in Fairfield County, Ohio
Townships in Ohio